Venaria Reale is a comune (municipality) in the Metropolitan City of Turin in the Italian region Piedmont, located about  northwest of Turin.

Venaria Reale borders the municipalities of Robassomero, Caselle Torinese, Druento, Borgaro Torinese, Turin, Pianezza, and Collegno.

A 19th-century distinguished citizen of Venaria Reale was Michele Lessona, an illustrious scientist and decorated Senatore del Regno.

Main sights
Royal Palace of Venaria (included in the UNESCO Heritage List in 1997)
Historical center, designed by Amedeo di Castellamonte in 1667–90 as a scenic background for the Royal Palace
La Mandria Regional Park

Twin towns — sister cities
Venaria Reale is twinned with:

  Brașov, Romania

Notes

References

External links
 Official website
 Reggia della Venaria Reale (Royal Palace of Venaria)